Elizabeth Thomas may refer to:
Elizabeth Thomas (poet) (1675–1731), British poet
Elizabeth Frances Amherst (poet) (later Thomas; 1716—1779), British poet
Elizabeth Thomas (poet/novelist) (1771–1855), British novelist and poet
Elizabeth Caruthers (died 1857), American pioneer settler who sometimes identified as Elizabeth Thomas
Elizebeth Thomas Werlein  (1883 – 1946), born Elizebeth Thomas, New Orleans conservationist
Bess Thomas (1892–1968), Australian librarian
Elizabeth Thomas (Egyptologist) (1907–1986), American Egyptologist
Elizabeth Marshall Thomas (born 1931), American anthropologist and author
Betty Thomas (born 1948), American actress
Betsy Thomas (born 1966), American television writer